Leucadendron discolor is a species of plant in the family Proteaceae. It is endemic to South Africa. It is threatened by habitat loss. In English the plant is known as the Piketberg Conebush and in Afrikaans as the Rooitolbos. L. discolor is a slow growing perennial. Growth of the root system and propagation, from a seed to the plant's first flower, can take up to two years. The male L. discolor 'Sunset' flowers exuberantly during early spring  exposing a colorful flowerhead during this time.The flower head is composed of a dome-like receptacle, and is densely covered with small male flowers. These plants are only able to reproduce after their third year of life. 

The species has potential to be commercially exported using new methods that aide in rooting, such as Indole-3-butyric acid (IBA).

Gallery

References

External links

discolor
Endemic flora of South Africa
Flora of the Cape Provinces
Fynbos
Endangered flora of Africa
Taxonomy articles created by Polbot